Udney is both a given name and surname. Notable people with the name include:

 Robert Udny or Udney (1725–1802), Scottish merchant and art collector
 Udney Hay (1739–1806), soldier during the American Revolutionary War
 Udney Richardson (1869–1943), Canadian politician

See also
 Udny (disambiguation)